The People's Action (abbreviated AP) was a minor Romanian right-wing political party, founded and led by former President Emil Constantinescu. It had no seats in the Parliament of Romania nor in the European Parliament. In April 2008, it merged into the National Liberal Party (PNL).

Electoral history

Legislative elections

Presidential elections

Conservative parties in Romania